The Hātea River is a river of New Zealand. It flows from the north-east of Whangarei southwards and into the northern head of Whangarei Harbour. Its lower length forms the eastern boundary of the city. The banks along the lower reaches are parks and bushland with a series of metalled walks suitable for all weathers.

At Whangarei Falls near Tikipunga, the Hātea River drops  over a basalt lava flow. The falls, originally known as Otuihau, have been a picnic spot since at least the 1890s.

The spelling of the river's name was amended from Hatea to Hātea by the New Zealand Geographic Board in 2007.

See also
List of rivers of New Zealand

References

Land Information New Zealand - Search for Place Names

Whangārei
Rivers of the Northland Region
Rivers of New Zealand